Belinda "Belle" Angelito Mariano (born June 10, 2002) is a Filipino actress, singer, and model. She began appearing on television at the age of nine playing supporting roles and starring in the comedy-themed show Goin' Bulilit. She starred in the film Four Sisters Before the Wedding and the television series He's Into Her.

Career

2012–2018: career beginnings, Lorenzo's Time, and Goin' Bulilit
Mariano was first seen in television as a commercial model starting at the age of nine. She then made her début as an actress when she appeared in Lorenzo's Time in 2012, a television series starring Zaijian Jaranilla. After that, she began appearing on various TV programs such as Maalaala Mo Kaya in an episode entitled Kabibe (2012), and Princess and I (2012) where she played the role of Young Bianca Maghirang played by Bianca Casado. She was also a cast member in the youth-oriented show Goin' Bulilit.

In 2013, she appeared in Juan dela Cruz, Muling Buksan Ang Puso, and Maria Mercedes. In all of these series, Mariano played younger versions of all of the main characters. Mariano then starred in the television series FPJ's Ang Probinsyano from 2015 to 2016, portraying the role of Rachel Tuazon, the sister of Arjo Atayde's character.

In 2015, she graduated in Goin Bulilit alongside fellow Bulilits Carl and Miguel.

In 2017, Mariano reunited with her Lorenzo's Time co-star Zaijian Jaranilla and paired up together for a Maalaala Mo Kaya episode, Cellphone. In the same year, she also appeared in the films Can't Help Falling In Love starring Kathryn Bernardo and Daniel Padilla as Bernardo's sister Grace Dela Cuesta, and Love You To The Stars and Back starring Julia Barretto and Joshua Garcia as Ronnabel.

In 2018, she made appearances in the television series Bagani (which stars Liza Soberano and Enrique Gil) as the young Gloria (Dimples Romana) as well as a cameo appearance in Playhouse starring Zanjoe Marudo and Angelica Panganiban.

2019–2020: Star Magic Circle, Four Sisters Before The Wedding, and "DonBelle" partnership

In 2019, she was part of the year's batch of artists launched in the Star Magic Circle together with Kyle Echarri, Melizza Jimenez, Sophie Reyes, Jeremiah Lisbo, Gillian Vicencio, Arielle Roces, Arabella del Rosario, Anthony Jennings, JC Alcantara, Glen Vargas, Kendru Garcia, Eisel Serrano, RA Lewis, Javi Benitez, and Aiyana Waggoner. In the same year, she appeared in the Bugoy Cariño-starrer film Danztep by Errol Ropero and in the hit series Kadenang Ginto as Catherine V. Herrera, the daughter of Leon, Richard Yap’s character in the series, as well as the Maalaala Mo Kaya episode Pregnancy Test. She also joined the Asia's songbird Regine Velasquez-Alcasid in the film Yours Truly, Shirley under Cinema One.

In November the same year, it was announced that Mariano will be teaming up with Donny Pangilinan for He's Into Her, an iWantTFC original series directed by Chad Vidanes that is based on the 2013 Wattpad novel of the same name by Maxine Lat a.k.a. Maxinejiji.

In 2020, she was among the first batch of artists from Star Magic to be handled by ABS-CBN Film's new talent management arm, Rise Artists Studio.

She had a cameo appearance in the film James and Pat and Dave (sequel to Vince and Kath and James) starring Ronnie Alonte, Loisa Andalio, and Donny Pangilinan. She played the role Trish, hinting the future romance with Dave, Pangilinan's character in the film and previewing her love team partnership with him as DonBelle. For their project He's Into Her, the production was postponed due to the COVID-19 pandemic, the ABS-CBN shutdown and the denial of franchise renewal.

In the same year, Mariano landed the role of the iconic Gabbie Salazar (previously played by Shaina Magdayao) and starred the prequel of the 2013 hit Four Sisters and a Wedding, 2020 film Four Sisters Before the Wedding. She was joined by actresses Alexa Ilacad, Charlie Dizon, and Gillian Vicencio as the newest Salazar sisters. The film became the No.1 top trending film as it arrived on Netflix Philippines and No.3 on Netflix Canada and UAE.

2021–present: He's Into Her, Daylight, and future projects 
In 2021, the long-awaited series He's Into Her had its record-breaking launch as it crashed the streaming platform iWant TFC upon its release due to the surge of the number of viewers who wanted to watch the premiere episode. The series was marked a huge success as it continuously trended all-throughout its run, and also helped the iWantTFC app to top all free entertainment apps in the country. It was also the number one most watched series on the streaming platform.

Following the series' success, the cast headlined a special online concert, He's Into Her: The Benison Ball for the fans to enjoy through the streaming platform KTX.ph. VIP tickets for the show became sold out after only three days since release. At the end of show, it was announced that a second season of the show will take place. Shortly after the successful concert, ABS-CBN Entertainment also unveiled He's Into Her: The Journey, a documentary about the making of the series. It showed the production of the show from the conceptualization, auditions, and the lock-in tapings. With the series' production passing to two years, the documentary also showed the hardship of the entire team and how they managed to push through the show even during a global pandemic and after the ABS-CBN shutdown.

In the same year, Mariano also made her mark in the music scene. She released her debut song Kung Ako Nalang for the special compilation album, Kumu Summer Album under Believe Music (on behalf of Nickl Entertainment). Shortly after, she released her debut single Sigurado under Star Music which was also included in the sound track of her series He's Into Her. As of May 2022, the single already garnered over 16M streams on Spotify and  7.5M views on YouTube.

Following the successful He's Into Her, the DonBelle love team landed their first ever lead movie under Star Cinema, romantic-comedy film Love Is Color Blind. The casts include their He's Into Her co-star Jeremiah Lisbo, as well as singer-actress Angelina Cruz, and TikTok contributor Esnyr Ranollo. It premiered through the streaming platform KTX.ph and Smart's GigaPlay app. Shortly after coming to Netflix, the film ranked atop the streaming service's trending lists in the Philippines.

She also released her debut album Daylight under Star Music as well as music video for lead single, Tanging Dahilan. She also released a visualizer video for For Your Eyes Only, music video for Rise and performance video for Nights of December. Her track For Your Eyes Only also became the OST for her movie Love Is Color Blind, marking her second song to be featured as a soundtrack.

She was also one of the artists to take part in ABS-CBN's 2021 Christmas Station ID, Andito Tayo Para Sa Isa't Isa along with Donny Pangilinan, Martin Nievera, Piolo Pascual, Gary Valenciano, Zsazsa Padilla, Erik Santos, KZ Tandingan, Kathryn Bernardo, Daniel Padilla, Sarah Geronimo, Sharon Cuneta, Vice Ganda, Regine Velasquez, Ogie Alcasid, Iñigo Pascual, Andrea Brillantes, Seth Fedelin, BGYO, and Darren Espanto.

In 2022, she opened the year through her successful concert Daylight: A Belle Mariano Digital Concert which was streamed via KTX.ph. Her first-ever solo concert reportedly sold over P300,000 worth of tickets in just two minutes after selling and reached over P500,000 in 30 minutes. SVIP and VIP tickets were also sold out. Her guest performers for the concert include Kyle Echarri, Ben&Ben, singer-songwriters Jayda Avanzado, SAB (Sabine Cerrado), Trisha Denise, and her love team partner Donny Pangilinan.

As her first acting project of the year, she starred in the third season of iWant TFC's original anthology series, Click, Like Share for the episode Swap with former Pinoy Big Brother housemate and fellow Rise artist Shanaia Gomez.

After starting taping and production in February, the most-awaited second season of He's Into Her officially premiered on April the same year. Upon release of the pilot episode, the series immediately became a trending topic in the Philippines. Together with the series, its soundtrack album was also released. Kahit Na, Kahit Pa, a song by Mariano was among the songs in the album, it peaked #1 on the top 10 songs on iTunes Philippines.

Apart from this, the Movie Cut of the first season of He's Into Her premiered at the Drive-In Cinema One: A Drive-Thru Movie Experience, in partnership with Ayala Malls Vertis North and Vertis North Estate.

In August, Star Magic toured in the United States as part of their 30th anniversary celebration. Mariano was among those who staged the shows. The artists first performed in the Newport Performing Arts Theater, Resorts World Manila, followed by the US shows in Kings Theater, Brooklyn, The Warfield, San Francisco, and in the Saban Theatre, Beverly Hills.

In September the same year, Mariano made history as the First-ever Filipina recipient of the Outstanding Asian Star award at the Seoul International Drama Awards. Among 175 actors and actresses from all over Asia, only 5 received the award. The other winners included Yusei Yagi from Japan, Alice Ko from Taiwan, Wallace Chung from China, and Krit Amnuaydechkorn from Thailand. She personally attended the 17th Seoul International Drama Awards that was held on the 22nd at the KBS Hall in Seoul, graced the red carpet event, and shared the stage with K-pop star Kang Daniel, and Japanese actor and singer Yusei Yagi as she received her award and said her acceptance speech.

Filmography

Film

Television

Concerts

Offline

Online

Documentary

Music Videos

Discography

Singles

Albums

Extended Plays

Appearances

Compilation Albums

Original Soundtracks

Station ID

Awards and nominations

Movies and Television Awards

Music Awards

Listicles

Notes

References

External links

2002 births
Living people
Filipino child actresses
Filipino film actresses
Filipino television actresses
People from Pasig
ABS-CBN personalities
Star Magic
Filipino female models
21st-century Filipino actresses